The Spanish Fly (German: Die spanische Fliege may refer to:

 The Spanish Fly (play), a 1913 play by Franz Arnold
 The Spanish Fly (1931 film), a German comedy film directed by Georg Jacoby
 The Spanish Fly (1955 film), a West German comedy film directed by Carl Boese